Symptomatic is the second studio album composed and performed by Belgian group Airlock.

Track listing 
 "The Other Way " – 5:53
 "I Am " – 4:09
 "No Gain " – 5:28
 "Before The Summertime " – 5:50
 "Don't Let Them (Change You) " – 4:21
 "Revealing Some Interest" – 6:01
 "Dangerman " – 5:03
 "Shape Of Light" – 5:46
 "Suffocated " – 5:17
 "Shelter " – 5:32
 "Two Dreams " – 12:21

References 
http://www.last.fm/music/Airlock/Symptomatic
http://www.amazon.com/Symptomatic-Airlock/dp/B0001Z2TVC

2004 albums
Airlock (band) albums